David Thomas Kemp, FRS (born 24 February 1945) is a British physicist who is a professor working at the UCL Ear Institute in London.

He was educated at King's College London (BSc, 1966; AKC; PhD, 1970). He discovered the phenomenon of otoacoustic emission in July 1978 while working at the Royal National Throat Nose and Ear Hospital. He founded a company that makes equipment to test for hearing defects by detecting otacoustic emission, which is absent in the ears of people suffering deafness caused by neural impairment. Because the method does not require any cooperation from the subject, it is valuable for detecting deafness in babies.

He was elected a Fellow of the Royal Society in 2004.

References

External links
 UCL News

1945 births
Living people
Academics of University College London
Alumni of King's College London
Associates of King's College London
Fellows of the Royal Society